The Mistress is a British sitcom that first aired on BBC2 from 1985 to 1987. Starring Felicity Kendal and Jane Asher, it was written by Carla Lane.

The Mistress features Kendal playing Maxine, a young florist, who is having an affair with a married man. It was disliked by some viewers, who were unhappy at seeing Felicity Kendal (best known as Barbara Good in The Good Life) playing a woman having an affair with someone else's husband.

Plot
Maxine is the owner of a florist shop and is having an affair with married man Luke. His wife Helen is unaware of the affair. While Maxine occasionally feels guilty and insecure about the affair, she is a generally optimistic and happy person.

Cast
Felicity Kendal – Maxine Mansel (Maxine – series 2)
Jack Galloway – Luke Carpenter (series 1) (called Luke Mansel in Series 2)
Peter McEnery – Luke  (series 2) (Luke Mansel in Series 2)
Jane Asher – Helen Carpenter (called Helen Mansel in Series 2)
Tony Aitken – Simon 
Jenny McCracken – Jenny (series 1)
Paul Copley – Jamie (series 2)
Peggy Sirr – Jo

Production
Similar to Carla Lane's other sitcoms, including Butterflies and Solo (which also starred Felicity Kendal), The Mistress has a serious theme – here, that of an affair. The series was produced and directed by Gareth Gwenlan. The Mistress was filmed in Bath, Somerset, the florist shop being in Abbey Green, Bath and Maxine's house location at 26 St Mark's Road, Bath. 
After the lukewarm response to Series 1 over the subject matter, Series 2 was an attempt, while still retaining the thread of an adulterous affair, to be more of a more general comedy. This attempt proved unsuccessful, however, and the series was axed after Series 2. The sitcom, which had never been reshown previously, was aired on BBC Four in January, February and March 2023.

Episodes
The Mistress aired for two series, each of six 30 minute episodes, from 17 January 1985 to 26 February 1987. The episodes were originally shown at 9.00pm on Thursdays on BBC2.

Series One (1985)

Series Two (1987)

DVD releases
The two series of The Mistress were released in a boxset in Region 2 (UK) on 10 March 2014.

References

External links 
 

1985 British television series debuts
1987 British television series endings
1980s British sitcoms
BBC television sitcoms
English-language television shows